The Principles of the Constitution of 1908 , also known as the Outline of Imperial Constitution or the Outline of the Constitution Compiled by Imperial Order, was an attempt by the Qing dynasty of China to establish a constitutional monarchy at the beginning of the 20th century. It established a constitutional monarchy and confirmed some basic rights of citizens, while imposing some limitations on the power of the monarch.

Since this outline of the constitution was not democratically formulated, but was promulgated in the name of the Guangxu Emperor by the Empress Dowager Cixi, it was called the "Outline of Imperial Constitution".

Main contents
Outline of Imperial Constitution was based on the "Constitution of the Empire of Japan", and consists of 23 articles, including the body text "Powers of the Monarch" (君上大权) and the appendix "Rights and Duties of Subjects" (臣民权利义务).

Impact and evaluation 
Although the Outline of Imperial Constitution was modelled on the Japanese Meiji Constitution, it is the first constitutional document in Chinese history.

See also
 Late Qing reforms
 Preparative Constitutionalism

References

Further reading
 
 
 
  Uploaded by the author at ResearchGate: Here

External links 

 Full text of Outline of Imperial Constitution (in Chinese).

Law in Qing dynasty
Defunct constitutions
Constitution of China